The canton of Barcelonnette is an administrative division in southeastern France. At the French canton reorganisation which came into effect in March 2015, the canton was expanded from 11 to 16 communes (4 of which merged into the new communes Val-d'Oronaye and Ubaye-Serre-Ponçon):
 
Barcelonnette
La Condamine-Châtelard
Enchastrayes
Faucon-de-Barcelonnette
Jausiers
Le Lauzet-Ubaye
Méolans-Revel
Pontis
Saint-Paul-sur-Ubaye
Saint-Pons
Les Thuiles
Ubaye-Serre-Ponçon
Uvernet-Fours 
Val-d'Oronaye

Demographics

See also
Cantons of the Alpes-de-Haute-Provence department 
Communes of France

References

Cantons of Alpes-de-Haute-Provence